Mallika Sarabhai (born 9 May 1954) is an activist and Indian classical dancer and actress from Ahmedabad, Gujarat, India. Daughter of a classical dancer Mrinalini Sarabhai and space scientist Vikram Sarabhai, Mallika is an accomplished Kuchipudi and Bharatanatyam dancer and performer who has specialized in using the arts for social change and transformation.

Early life
Mallika Sarabhai was born in Ahmedabad, Gujarat, India to Vikram Sarabhai and Mrinalini Sarabhai. She completed her MBA from IIM Ahmedabad in 1974 and Doctorate in Organisational Behaviour from the Gujarat University in 1976. She is a noted choreographer and dancer and has also acted in a few Hindi, Malayalam, Gujarati and international films.

Career
She started to learn dancing when she was young and started her film career in the parallel cinema when she was 15. Mallika played the role of Draupadi in the Peter Brook's play The Mahabharata. Mallika has won many accolades during her long career, the Golden Star Award is one of them, which she won for the Best Dance Soloist, Theatre De Champs Elysees, Paris 1977. As well as a dancer, Sarabhai is a social activist. She manages the Darpana Academy of Performing Arts located at Ahmedabad, a centre for the arts and for the use of arts as a language for behaviour change.

Performance
She acted in the Hindi movie titled Himalay Se Ooncha that was released in 1975.  The movie which had Sunil Dutt as the hero, did not do very well at the box office. In 1986 she acted in the Basu Chatterji directed movie titled Sheesha opposite super star Mithun Chakraborty.

In 1989 she performed hard-hitting solo theatrical works, Shakti: The Power of Women. Her performance Sita's Daughters has toured the world and been performed over 500 times in three languages. After that, she directed and acted in numerous productions reflecting current issues and awareness among people. Amongst them is An Idea Named Meera; In Search of the Goddess and SvaKranti: The Revolution Within.

Mallika Sarabhai also wrote the script for the play 'Unsuni' based on Harsh Mander's book 'Unheard Voices' to raise awareness amongst children in elite schools and colleges to the real issues facing India's marginalized. The play went around 120 schools and colleges. Arvind Gaur later directed it as a play, with the same name. Darpana Academy has launched the people awareness movement through its production Unsuni which travels all over India.

In 2009 Mallika Sarabhai acted in an Indian adaptation Bertolt Brecht's of The Good Person of Szechwan (Ahmedabadki Aurat Bhali-Ramkali) directed by Arvind Gaur in 34th Vikram Sarabhai International Art Festival.

In the year 2012, Mallika co-directed 'Women with Broken Wings,' an international production with filmmaker Yadavan Chandran and Swiss pianist Elizabeth Sombart, an ode to the millions of women who have been the victims of violence. In 2014 she recreated, with Yadavan Chandran, Kadak Badshaahi, a multimedia production on the 603-year-old history of the city of Ahmedabad. The performance ran for an unprecedented 33 full nights in Darpana's venue, Natarani.

Television 
Mallika has also used film and television for social change, especially for women's empowerment and environmental consciousness. Through Darpana Communications, she has been responsible for the production of three thousand hours of TV broadcast programming, all of which has been shown through Doordarshan, Gujarati. The programming uses the most popular genres of TV. She has anchored many shows on STAR TV and Doordarshan as well as the first NACO series on HIV, Talk Positive; the science series Turning Point; Vaividhyotsav, the culture quiz and Srishti: The Environment Quiz.

Writing
Mallika first started writing when she produced and performed Shakti: The Power of Women. Since then she has scripted her shows, TV serials for ISROs educational TV in Madhya Pradesh, film scripts and more new contemporary lyrics for Bharatanatyam. She has been a columnist for Times of India, Vanitha, The Week, DivyaBhaskar, Hans and DNA.

Her recent memoir is title, In Free Fall, My Experiments With Living. She recently appeared on a podcast, The Literary City with Ramjee Chandran to talk about the memoir.

Politics
On 19 March 2009, Mallika Sarabhai announced her candidature against the Bharatiya Janata Party's prime ministerial candidate L K Advani for the Gandhinagar Lok Sabha seat, as an independent candidate in the 2009 general election. She had several offers from the Congress to contest elections, the first being in 1984 from Rajiv Gandhi, but did not join any political party as she believed that all parties are corrupt. She eventually lost to L K Advani by a huge margin and forfeited her election deposit in the process.

She protested against Gujarat Chief Minister, Narendra Modi during Sadbhavna Mission in September 2011. She accused Narendra Modi of scuttling the petition filed in Supreme court by her on the 2002 Gujarat violence. She joined the Aam Aadmi Party on 8 January 2014.

Personal life 
Mallika met Bipin Shah in 1982 and married him. They have two children, a son, Revanta and a daughter Anahita. They divorced in 1989.
Bipin and Mallika co-founded Mapin Publishing in 1984 and continue to run it together.The loss of her mother, classical dancer Mrinalini Sarabhai, in 2016, left her bereft; yoga, dance, Transcendental Meditation (TM) and Non-Violent Communication (NVC) were some of the ways that she coped.

She is the cousin of Indian politician and member of the Communist Party of India (Marxist) Subhashini Ali, daughter of her mother’s sister Captain Lakshmi Sehgal (née Dr. Lakshmi Swaminathan) and Colonel Prem Sehgal. Her brother is environmental educator and director of Centre for Environment Education (CEE) Kartikeya Sarabhai.

Honour
 Government of Gujarat awarded her with 'Gaurav Puraskar' for the contribution in the field of drama and dance.
 She received the Padma Bhushan by government of India.
 The French Government awarded her with a knight's rank in the  Order of Academic Palms in 2005 for her contribution in the field of drama and dance.

Gallery

See also 
 Indian women in dance
 Sarabhai family
 Vikram Sarabhai
 Mrinalini Sarabhai
 Jan Lokpal Bill

References

Further reading
 India's 50 Most Illustrious Women by Indra Gupta

External links

 Mallika Sarabhai's personal website
 Welcome to World of Darpana
 
 
 

1954 births
Living people
Actresses from Gujarat
Indian civil rights activists
Indian Institute of Management Ahmedabad alumni
Indian human rights activists
Indian women activists
Indian women's rights activists
Dancers from Gujarat
Recipients of the Padma Bhushan in arts
Recipients of the Sangeet Natak Akademi Award
Chevaliers of the Ordre des Arts et des Lettres
Kuchipudi exponents
Performers of Indian classical dance
Actresses in Gujarati cinema
Actresses in Malayalam cinema
Sarabhai family
20th-century Indian dancers
20th-century Indian women artists
20th-century Indian actresses
Women writers from Gujarat
Activists from Gujarat
Women artists from Gujarat
21st-century Indian dancers
21st-century Indian women artists
Indian female classical dancers
21st-century Indian women politicians
21st-century Indian politicians
Women in Gujarat politics
Film directors from Gujarat
Screenwriters from Gujarat
Indian women screenwriters
Indian women film directors
21st-century Indian actresses
Women civil rights activists